Raga Ramkali is an early morning raga in Hindustani classical music which belongs to Bhairav Thaat. In this raga, as in Bhairav, Rishabh and Dhaivat are Komal(flat), but the Teevra  and the flat nishad are added.
The vadi-samvadi are Pancham and Shadja.
The aroha is S r G M P, G M d N S' and the avroha is S' N d P m P, d (N)d P, G M r S. Flat nishad (seventh degree) and sharp madhyama (fourth degree) are used often.

Raga Ramkali also appears in Sikh tradition in North India and is a part of Sikh Scripture Sri Guru Granth Sahib Ji. Another form of this Raga present in Sri Guru Granth Sahib Ji is 'Raga Ramkali Dakhni'.

Theory

Arohana and avarohana 

Arohana: 

Avarohana: 

Vadi : Pa

Samavadi : Sa

Pakad/Chalan :

Description 
This raag is very similar to Raga Bhairav. Rishabh and Dhaivat are less oscillating in Raag Ramkali than in Bhairav. This Raga is sung in middle and upper octave, which discriminates it from Bhairav.

In Ramkali, Teevra Madhyam and Komal Nishad are used in a specific combination in Avroh like: . Generally, Rishabh is skipped in Aaroh like: .

References 

Hindustani ragas
Ragas in the Guru Granth Sahib